Kohima Law College is a college imparting legal education in Kohima, Nagaland, India. It was established in the year 1975. This college is affiliated to Nagaland University. This college is also approved by the Bar Council of India.

Courses 
The college offers a three years B.A. LL.B. course.

References

Education in Kohima
Law schools in Nagaland
Universities and colleges in Nagaland
Colleges affiliated to Nagaland University
Educational institutions established in 1975
1975 establishments in Nagaland